is an erotic thriller manga by Senno Knife about a doctor who creates an android in his daughter's image that becomes uncontrollable.

External links 
 

Horror anime and manga
1985 manga